The 1984–85 Chicago Bulls season was the 19th season of the franchise in the National Basketball Association (NBA). In the summer of 1984, the team's fortunes changed when it received the third pick of the NBA draft, after Houston and Portland. The Rockets selected Hakeem Olajuwon, the Blazers selected Sam Bowie, and the Bulls picked shooting guard Michael Jordan out of the University of North Carolina.
The team, with new management in owner Jerry Reinsdorf and Jerry Krause in the front office, decided to rebuild around Jordan. Jordan set franchise records during his rookie campaign for scoring (3rd in the league) and steals (4th in the league), and led the Bulls back to the playoffs, for which he was rewarded with a berth on the All-NBA second team and NBA Rookie of the Year Award.

Draft picks

Roster

Player stats

Regular season

Playoffs

Regular season

Record vs. opponents

Game log

Regular season

|- align="center" bgcolor="#ccffcc"
| 1
| October 26, 1984
| Washington
| W 109–93
|
|
|
| Chicago Stadium
| 1–0
|- align="center" bgcolor="#ffcccc"
| 2
| October 27, 1984
| @ Milwaukee
| L 106–108
|
|
|
| MECCA Arena
| 1–1
|- align="center" bgcolor="#ccffcc"
| 3
| October 29, 1984
| Milwaukee
| W 116–110
|
|
|
| Chicago Stadium
| 2–1
|- align="center" bgcolor="#ccffcc"
| 4
| October 30, 1984
| @ Kansas City
| W 109–104
|
|
|
| Kemper Arena
| 3–1

|- align="center" bgcolor="#ffcccc"
| 5
| November 1, 1984
| @ Denver
| L 113–129
|
|
|
| McNichols Sports Arena
| 3–2
|- align="center" bgcolor="#ccffcc"
| 6
| November 7, 1984
| @ Detroit
| W 122–118
|
|
|
| Pontiac Silverdome
| 4–2
|- align="center" bgcolor="#ccffcc"
| 7
| November 8, 1984
| @ New York
| W 121–106
|
|
|
| Madison Square Garden
| 5–2
|- align="center" bgcolor="#ccffcc"
| 8
| November 10, 1984
| @ Indiana
| W 118–116
|
|
|
| Market Square Arena
| 6–2
|- align="center" bgcolor="#ccffcc"
| 9
| November 13, 1984
| San Antonio
| W 120–117
|
|
|
| Chicago Stadium
| 7–2
|- align="center" bgcolor="#ffcccc"
| 10
| November 15, 1984
| Boston
| L 105–125
|
|
|
| Chicago Stadium
| 7–3
|- align="center" bgcolor="#ffcccc"
| 11
| November 17, 1984
| Philadelphia
| L 100–109
|
|
|
| Chicago Stadium
| 7–4
|- align="center" bgcolor="#ffcccc"
| 12
| November 19, 1984
| Indiana
| L 120–137
|
|
|
| Chicago Stadium
| 7–5
|- align="center" bgcolor="#ffcccc"
| 13
| November 21, 1984
| @ Milwaukee
| L 98–108
|
|
|
| MECCA Arena
| 7–6
|- align="center" bgcolor="#ccffcc"
| 14
| November 23, 1984
| @ Seattle
| W 113–94
|
|
|
| Kingdome
| 8–6
|- align="center" bgcolor="#ffcccc"
| 15
| November 24, 1984
| @ Portland
| L 131–141
|
|
|
| Memorial Coliseum
| 8–7
|- align="center" bgcolor="#ffcccc"
| 16
| November 27, 1984
| @ Golden State
| L 103–109
|
|
|
| Oakland-Alameda County Coliseum Arena
| 8–8
|- align="center" bgcolor="#ffcccc"
| 17
| November 29, 1984
| @ Phoenix
| L 95–100
|
|
|
| Arizona Veterans Memorial Coliseum
| 8–9
|- align="center" bgcolor="#ccffcc"
| 18
| November 30, 1984
| @ L.A. Clippers
| W 104–100
|
|
|
| Los Angeles Memorial Sports Arena
| 9–9

|- align="center" bgcolor="#ccffcc"
| 19
| December 2, 1984
| @ L.A. Lakers
| W 113–112
| Dailey (28)
| Greenwood (13)
| Corzine (7)
| The Forum15,505
| 10–9
|- align="center" bgcolor="#ffcccc"
| 20
| December 4, 1984
| New Jersey
| W 112–97
|
|
|
| Chicago Stadium
| 11–9
|- align="center" bgcolor="#ccffcc"
| 21
| December 7, 1984
| New York
| W 95–93
|
|
|
| Chicago Stadium
| 12–9
|- align="center" bgcolor="#ccffcc"
| 22
| December 8, 1984
| Dallas
| W 99–97
|
|
|
| Chicago Stadium
| 13–9
|- align="center" bgcolor="#ffcccc"
| 23
| December 11, 1984
| Detroit
| L 101–108
|
|
|
| Chicago Stadium
| 13–10
|- align="center" bgcolor="#ffcccc"
| 24
| December 12, 1984
| @ Detroit
| L 95–102
|
|
|
| Pontiac Silverdome
| 13–11
|- align="center" bgcolor="#ffcccc"
| 25
| December 14, 1984
| @ New Jersey
| L 109–111
|
|
|
| Brendan Byrne Arena
| 13–12
|- align="center" bgcolor="#ffcccc"
| 26
| December 15, 1984
| Philadelphia
| L 102–114
|
|
|
| Chicago Stadium
| 13–13
|- align="center" bgcolor="#ffcccc"
| 27
| December 18, 1984
| Houston
| L 96–104
|
|
|
| Chicago Stadium
| 13–14
|- align="center" bgcolor="#ccffcc"
| 28
| December 20, 1984
| @ Atlanta
| W 132–129 (2OT)
|
|
|
| The Omni
| 14–14
|- align="center" bgcolor="#ccffcc"
| 29
| December 22, 1984
| Boston
| W 110–85
|
|
|
| Chicago Stadium
| 15–14
|- align="center" bgcolor="#ccffcc"
| 30
| December 27, 1984
| Cleveland
| W 112–108
|
|
|
| Chicago Stadium
| 16–14
|- align="center" bgcolor="#ffcccc"
| 31
| December 29, 1984
| Atlanta
| L 101–104
|
|
|
| Chicago Stadium
| 16–15

|- align="center" bgcolor="#ffcccc"
| 32
| January 2, 1985
| @ Atlanta
| L 107–121
|
|
|
| The Omni
| 17–15
|- align="center" bgcolor="#ccffcc"
| 33
| January 4, 1985
| Milwaukee
| W 106–101
|
|
|
| Chicago Stadium
| 17–16
|- align="center" bgcolor="#ffcccc"
| 34
| January 5, 1985
| @ New York
| L 113–119
|
|
|
| Madison Square Garden
| 17–17
|- align="center" bgcolor="#ffcccc"
| 35
| January 9, 1985
| @ Boston
| L 108–111
|
|
|
| Boston Garden
| 17–18
|- align="center" bgcolor="#ccffcc"
| 36
| January 11, 1985
| New York
| W 113–97
|
|
|
| Chicago Stadium
| 18–18
|- align="center" bgcolor="#ffcccc"
| 37
| January 12, 1985
| @ Cleveland
| L 98–101
|
|
|
| Richfield Coliseum
| 18–19
|- align="center" bgcolor="#ccffcc"
| 38
| January 14, 1985
| Denver
| W 122–113
|
|
|
| Chicago Stadium
| 19–19
|- align="center" bgcolor="#ffcccc"
| 39
| January 16, 1985
| @ New Jersey
| L 94–100
|
|
|
| Brendan Byrne Arena
| 19–20
|- align="center" bgcolor="#ccffcc"
| 40
| January 17, 1985
| Cleveland
| W 98–93
|
|
|
| Chicago Stadium
| 20–20
|- align="center" bgcolor="#ffcccc"
| 41
| January 19, 1985
| @ Indiana
| L 107–110
|
|
|
| Market Square Arena
| 20–21
|- align="center" bgcolor="#ccffcc"
| 42
| January 22, 1985
| Portland
| W 123–115
|
|
|
| Chicago Stadium
| 21–21
|- align="center" bgcolor="#ccffcc"
| 43
| January 25, 1985
| Seattle
| W 93–76
|
|
|
| Chicago Stadium
| 22–21
|- align="center" bgcolor="#ccffcc"
| 44
| January 26, 1985
| Atlanta
| W 117–104
|
|
|
| Chicago Stadium
| 23–21
|- align="center" bgcolor="#ccffcc"
| 45
| January 29, 1985
| Kansas City
| W 103–97
|
|
|
| Chicago Stadium
| 24–21
|- align="center" bgcolor="#ffcccc"
| 46
| January 30, 1985
| @ Washington
| L 95–106
|
|
|
| Capital Centre
| 24–22

|- align="center" bgcolor="#ffcccc"
| 47
| February 1, 1985
| @ Philadelphia
| L 110–121
|
|
|
| The Spectrum
| 24–23
|- align="center" bgcolor="#ffcccc"
| 48
| February 5, 1985
| Boston
| L 106–110
|
|
|
| Chicago Stadium
| 24–24
|- align="center" bgcolor="#ffcccc"
| 49
| February 7, 1985
| @ Cleveland
| L 99–108
|
|
|
| Richfield Coliseum
| 24–25
|- align="center"
|colspan="9" bgcolor="#bbcaff"|All-Star Break
|- style="background:#cfc;"
|- bgcolor="#bbffbb"
|- align="center" bgcolor="#ccffcc"
| 50
| February 12, 1985
| Detroit
| W 139–126 (OT)
|
|
|
| Chicago Stadium
| 25–25
|- align="center" bgcolor="#ffcccc"
| 51
| February 15, 1985
| Indiana
| L 96–114
|
|
|
| Chicago Stadium
| 25–26
|- align="center" bgcolor="#ffcccc"
| 52
| February 17, 1985
| @ Milwaukee
| L 105–125
|
|
|
| MECCA Arena
| 25–27
|- align="center" bgcolor="#ffcccc"
| 53
| February 19, 1985
| L.A. Lakers
| L 117–127
| Woolridge (30)
| Woolridge (6)
| Jordan, Matthews (8)
| Chicago Stadium19,052
| 25–28
|- align="center" bgcolor="#ffcccc"
| 54
| February 22, 1985
| @ Boston
| L 105–115
|
|
|
| Hartford Civic Center
| 25–29
|- align="center" bgcolor="#ccffcc"
| 55
| February 23, 1985
| Golden State
| W 140–125
|
|
|
| Chicago Stadium
| 26–29
|- align="center" bgcolor="#ffcccc"
| 56
| February 26, 1985
| Cleveland
| L 118–123 (OT)
|
|
|
| Chicago Stadium
| 26–30
|- align="center" bgcolor="#ffcccc"
| 57
| February 27, 1985
| @ Detroit
| L 99–108
|
|
|
| Pontiac Silverdome
| 26–31

|- align="center" bgcolor="#ccffcc"
| 58
| March 1, 1985
| New York
| W 109–104
|
|
|
| Chicago Stadium
| 27–31
|- align="center" bgcolor="#ffcccc"
| 59
| March 3, 1985
| New Jersey
| L 113–117
|
|
|
| Chicago Stadium
| 27–32
|- align="center" bgcolor="#ccffcc"
| 60
| March 5, 1985
| Washington
| W 104–99
|
|
|
| Chicago Stadium
| 28–32
|- align="center" bgcolor="#ccffcc"
| 61
| March 6, 1985
| @ Boston
| W 107–104
|
|
|
| Boston Garden
| 29–32
|- align="center" bgcolor="#ccffcc"
| 62
| March 8, 1985
| L.A. Clippers
| W 117–101
|
|
|
| Chicago Stadium
| 30–32
|- align="center" bgcolor="#ffcccc"
| 63
| March 9, 1985
| Utah
| L 105–111
|
|
|
| Chicago Stadium
| 30–33
|- align="center" bgcolor="#ffcccc"
| 64
| March 11, 1985
| @ Washington
| L 112–119
|
|
|
| Capital Centre
| 30–34
|- align="center" bgcolor="#ccffcc"
| 65
| March 12, 1985
| Detroit
| W 111–110
|
|
|
| Chicago Stadium
| 31–34
|- align="center" bgcolor="#ffcccc"
| 66
| March 14, 1985
| @ New York
| L 97–106
|
|
|
| Madison Square Garden
| 31–35
|- align="center" bgcolor="#ccffcc"
| 67
| March 15, 1985
| Phoenix
| W 103–97
|
|
|
| Chicago Stadium
| 32–35
|- align="center" bgcolor="#ccffcc"
| 68
| March 17, 1985
| Milwaukee
| W 119–117 (OT)
|
|
|
| Chicago Stadium
| 33–35
|- align="center" bgcolor="#ffcccc"
| 69
| March 19, 1985
| @ Houston
| L 100–106
|
|
|
| The Summit
| 33–36
|- align="center" bgcolor="#ffcccc"
| 70
| March 20, 1985
| @ San Antonio
| L 98–106
|
|
|
| HemisFair Arena
| 33–37
|- align="center" bgcolor="#ccffcc"
| 71
| March 23, 1985
| @ Dallas
| W 107–97
|
|
|
| Reunion Arena
| 34–37
|- align="center" bgcolor="#ffcccc"
| 72
| March 24, 1985
| @ Utah
| L 92–110
|
|
|
| Salt Palace Acord Arena
| 34–38
|- align="center" bgcolor="#ccffcc"
| 73
| March 26, 1985
| Indiana
| W 120–119
|
|
|
| Chicago Stadium
| 35–38
|- align="center" bgcolor="#ffcccc"
| 74
| March 28, 1985
| @ Cleveland
| L 114–122
|
|
|
| Richfield Coliseum
| 35–39
|- align="center" bgcolor="#ffcccc"
| 75
| March 30, 1985
| Philadelphia
| L 117–122
|
|
|
| Chicago Stadium
| 35–40

|- align="center" bgcolor="#ffcccc"
| 76
| April 2, 1985
| New Jersey
| W 108–94
|
|
|
| Chicago Stadium
| 36–40
|- align="center" bgcolor="#ccffcc"
| 77
| April 3, 1985
| @ Washington
| W 100–91
|
|
|
| Capital Centre
| 37–40
|- align="center" bgcolor="#ffcccc"
| 78
| April 5, 1985
| @ Philadelphia
| L 113–116
|
|
|
| The Spectrum
| 37–41
|- align="center" bgcolor="#ccffcc"
| 79
| April 6, 1985
| @ Atlanta
| W 117–114
|
|
|
| The Omni
| 38–41
|- align="center" bgcolor="#ffcccc"
| 80
| April 8, 1985
| @ Indiana
| L 103–107
|
|
|
| Market Square Arena
| 38–42
|- align="center" bgcolor="#ffcccc"
| 81
| April 12, 1985
| Atlanta
| L 108–119
|
|
|
| Chicago Stadium
| 38–43
|- align="center" bgcolor="#ffcccc"
| 82
| April 13, 1985
| @ New Jersey
| L 111–123
|
|
|
| Brendan Byrne Arena
| 38–44

Playoffs

|- align="center" bgcolor="#ffcccc"
| 1
| April 19, 1985
| @ Milwaukee
| L 100–109
| Dailey (25)
| Greenwood (13)
| Jordan (10)
| MECCA Arena11,052
| 0–1
|- align="center" bgcolor="#ffcccc"
| 2
| April 21, 1985
| @ Milwaukee
| L 115–122
| Jordan (30)
| Oldham (9)
| Jordan (12)
| MECCA Arena11,052
| 0–2
|- align="center" bgcolor="#ccffcc"
| 3
| April 24, 1985
| Milwaukee
| W 109–107
| Jordan (35)
| Green (9)
| Jordan (7)
| Chicago Stadium17,225
| 1–2
|- align="center" bgcolor="#ffcccc"
| 4
| April 26, 1985
| Milwaukee
| L 97–105
| Jordan (29)
| Corzine (9)
| Jordan (5)
| Chicago Stadium17,787
| 1–3
|-

Awards and records
 Michael Jordan, NBA Rookie of the Year Award
 Michael Jordan, All-NBA Second Team
 Michael Jordan, NBA All-Rookie Team 1st Team
 Michael Jordan, NBA All-Star Game

References

 Bulls on Database Basketball
 Bulls on Basketball Reference

Chicago Bulls seasons
Chicago
Chicago Bulls
Chicago Bulls